Coutures is a former commune in the Maine-et-Loire department in western France. On 15 December 2016, it was merged into the new commune Brissac Loire Aubance.

Notable people
Ernestine Chassebœuf, letter writer

See also
Communes of the Maine-et-Loire department

References

Former communes of Maine-et-Loire